Wanderson de Macedo Costa (born 31 May 1992) is a Brazilian footballer.

References

Brazilian footballers
1992 births
Living people
Rio Branco Sport Club players
Agremiação Sportiva Arapiraquense players
Associação Atlética Ponte Preta players
Paraná Clube players
C.D. Nacional players
Paysandu Sport Club players
Salgueiro Atlético Clube players
Botafogo Futebol Clube (PB) players
Gwangju FC players
Jeonnam Dragons players
K League 1 players
K League 2 players
Campeonato Brasileiro Série B players
Campeonato Brasileiro Série C players
Primeira Liga players
Brazilian expatriate footballers
Expatriate footballers in Portugal
Brazilian expatriate sportspeople in Portugal
Expatriate footballers in South Korea
Brazilian expatriate sportspeople in South Korea
Association football forwards